Bret Bergmark (born November 24, 1973) is an American professional mixed martial artist who most recently competed in the Welterweight division. A professional competitor since 2002, Bergmark has formerly competed for the WEC, Strikeforce, and Pancrase.

Biography
Bret was born in Novato, California, the son of a San Francisco police officer.  He attended and graduated from San Marin High School, where he wrestled for four years. After high school Bret took up rodeo bull riding, until a wrist injury forced him to retire. It was at this time that Bret turned his energy toward training in Gracie Jiu Jitsu, joining the Ralph Gracie academy in 1999. After gaining his blue belt he left the Ralph Gracie academy to train at the Cesar Gracie academy in Pleasant Hill, California, in 2002. It was at the Cesar Gracie academy that Bret earned his purple belt and started fighting in professional MMA matches.  Bret currently trains and teaches out of the Cesar Gracie academy in Pleasant Hill, California.  He also occasionally trains at the respective academies of Jake Shields (Graciefighter Berkeley), Nick Diaz and Nate Diaz (Graciefighter Lodi), Gilbert Melendez (El Nino Training Center), Jon Santos (Team Santos Jiu Jitsu) and Dave Terrell (Nor Cal Fighting Alliance).

Mixed martial arts career
Bergmark had his first professional MMA fight on August 3, 2002, shortly after joining the Cesar Gracie academy. He fought Paul Ano in Warriors Quest 6 - The Best of the Best.  After a brutal fight, which saw each fighter give and receive punishment, Bergmark locked up an armbar at 4:45 of the second round forcing the referee to stop the action and giving Bret the victory.

Bret next fought in a superfight for the Ultimate Athlete 4 - King of the Mountain tournament on September 28, 2002.  He was matched up against seasoned veteran and American Kickboxing Academy member Brian Ebersole. The fight would go the distance, with both fighters landing punches and takedowns. Bergmark would earn the victory via split decision.

Bret's third fight was against Brodie Farber at WEC 6: Return of a Legend on March 27, 2003. After some early ground fighting that saw Bret taking his opponent down and several sweeps  and reversals, Bret finally achieved mount and forced the referee to stop the match at 3:57 of the first round due to strikes, giving Bret the victory.

For his fourth fight Bret moved to the legendary Pancrase organization in Japan, taking on UFC and Pancrase veteran Keiichiro Yamamiya at Pancrase Hybrid: 11 on December 21, 2003.  After going all three rounds without either fighter able to finish the bout, the fight went to the judges scorecards and was ruled a draw.

Bret's next fight was back in the WEC at WEC 10: Bragging Rights on May 21, 2004.  Again Bret was matched up against a seasoned Pancrase veteran in Daisuke Ishii.  In an exciting back and forth fight that saw action both on the ground and on the feet, Bret finally secured the mount and forced the referee to stop the fight at 4:49 of the first round due to strikes, earning him his fourth victory.

On October 14, 2005 Bret took on Mike Pyle at WEC 17: Halloween Fury 4.  The fight quickly went to the ground, where after several reversals of position Pyle locked in a triangle choke, forcing Bret to tap at 3:36 of the first round and giving Bret his first loss.

After a two-year layoff, Bret dropped to the 170 pound weight class to fight Jesse Juarez on April 26, 2008, in the Iroquois MMA championships.  After 3 rounds of action Bret earned a unanimous decision.

Bret made his Strikeforce debut on June 26, 2010 in San Jose California as he fought Vagner Rocha in the prelims. Bret earned his first victory for the company by unanimous decision.

Bret was scheduled to fight October 9, 2010 at Strikeforce: Diaz vs. Noons II against Cung Le product James Terry, but had to pull out due to an injury sustained while training for the fight.

Brazilian Jiu-Jitsu
Bergmark is currently a Brazilian Jiu Jitsu brown belt under the world-renowned Cesar Gracie, with whom he has been training since 2002.

Muay Thai
Bret also trains in Muay Thai kickboxing, starting his training with World Team USA and then continuing at Gym 445 in San Francisco, California.  He currently trains Muay Thai at Fairtex Gym in San Francisco.

Mixed martial arts record

|-
| Win
|align=center|6–1–1
| Vagner Rocha
|Decision (unanimous)
|Strikeforce: Fedor vs. Werdum
|
|align=center|3
|align=center|5:00
|San Jose, California, United States
|
|-
|  Win
|align=center|5–1–1
| Jesse Juarez
|Decision (unanimous)
|Iroquois Mixed Martial Arts Championships III
|
|align=center|3
|align=center|5:00
|Ontario, California
|
|-
|  Loss
|align=center|4–1–1
| Mike Pyle
|Submission (triangle choke)
|WEC 17
|
|align=center|1
|align=center|3.36
|Lemoore, California, United States
|
|-
|  Win
|align=center|4–0–1
| Daisuke Ishii
|TKO (punches)
|WEC 10
|
|align=center|1
|align=center|4:49
|Lemoore, California, United States
|
|-
| Draw
|align=center|3–0–1
| Keiichiro Yamamiya
|Draw
|Pancrase: Hybrid 11
|
|align=center|3
|align=center|5:00
|Tokyo, Japan 
|
|-
| Win
|align=center|3–0
| Brodie Farber
|TKO (punches)
|WEC 6
|
|align=center|1
|align=center|3:57
|Lemoore, California, United States
|
|-
| Win
|align=center|2–0
| Brian Ebersole
|Decision (split)
|Ultimate Athlete 4: King of the Mountain
|
|align=center|3
|align=center|5:00
|Auberry, California, United States
|
|-
| Win
|align=center|1–0
| Paul Ano
|Submission (armbar)
|Warrior's Quest 6: Best of the Best
|
|align=center|2
|align=center|4:45
|Honolulu, Hawaii, United States
|

References

External links
Official Website
Graciefighter Biography

Pancrase Profile
Subfighter.com Profile

Living people
1973 births
American male mixed martial artists
Mixed martial artists from California
Welterweight mixed martial artists
Mixed martial artists utilizing Muay Thai
Mixed martial artists utilizing sanshou
Mixed martial artists utilizing Brazilian jiu-jitsu
American practitioners of Brazilian jiu-jitsu
American Muay Thai practitioners
American sanshou practitioners
People from Novato, California
Sportspeople from the San Francisco Bay Area